Kuban is a surname. Notable people with the surname include:

Adam Kuban
Ali Hassan Kuban
Bob Kuban (born 1940), American musician and bandleader
Doğan Kuban (1926-2021), Turkish architectural historian
Lukáš Kubáň (born 1987), Czech footballer
Milan Kuban (born 1976), Slovak slalom canoeist